Paranchus is a genus of ground beetle native to Europe, the Near East, the Nearctic and North Africa. The species of this genus are either black or brown coloured.

Species
These four species belong to the genus Paranchus:
 Paranchus albipes (Fabricius, 1794)  (worldwide)
 Paranchus debilis (Wollaston, 1864)  (the Canary Islands)
 Paranchus euthemon (Andrewes, 1931)  (Indonesia)
 Paranchus nichollsii (Wollaston, 1864)  (the Canary Islands)

References

External links
Paranchus at Fauna Europaea

Platyninae